Shaikh Abdussalam Abdurrazzaq (born 1941 in Panvel) known by his pen name Salam Bin Razzaq is a Mumbai-based Urdu and Hindi short story writer and translator. His short story collection Shikasta Buton Ke Darmiyan won the 2004 Sahitya Akademi Award for Urdu.

References

Recipients of the Sahitya Akademi Award in Urdu
1941 births
Living people
Recipients of the Sahitya Akademi Prize for Translation